The Gnosca Observatory (code: 143) is an astronomical observatory at Gnosca, Ticino, Switzerland. It is owned and operated by amateur astronomer Stefano Sposetti and has the observatory code 143. At Gnosca Observatory, Stefano Sposetti has discovered numerous minor planets (also see :Category:Discoveries by Stefano Sposetti).

See also 
 List of asteroid-discovering observatories
 List of minor planet discoverers

External links 
 143-Gnosca (official website)

Gnosca
Buildings and structures in Ticino